Hugh de Burgh (died 1352) was an Irish lawyer, Crown official and judge who held the offices of Lord Treasurer of Ireland (1340–44 and 1349–52) and Chief Baron of the Irish Exchequer (1337–39 and 1344–51), and was praised for his good service to the English Crown and pardoned of accusations of maladministration.

Background
Although he is said to have been born in England, he was a member of the leading Anglo-Irish de Burgh dynasty and was a cousin of William Donn de Burgh, 3rd Earl of Ulster. He later acted as attorney for the Earl's daughter and heiress Elizabeth, Duchess of Clarence. Her mother, Maud of Lancaster, who was a second cousin to King Edward III, used her considerable influence at Court on Hugh's behalf. 

Despite the later complaints about his misconduct, he was a professional lawyer and, as such, better qualified for appointment to the Bench than some of his colleagues: the Barons of the Court of Exchequer (Ireland) in that era were often accused of being deficient in their knowledge of the law. As was then usual when seeking an appointment to the Bench, he took holy orders.

Service
De Burgh was in the service of the Crown in 1331 when he came to Ireland. He later became the Irish attorney to Queen Philippa of Hainault. In 1335, he became third Baron of the Court of Exchequer (Ireland). In 1337 he was continued in office for four years, in consideration of his past good service to the Crown, and shortly afterwards he became Chief Baron. He was appointed Keeper of the Great Seal of Ireland, and was its custodian on 23 February 1341 until he relinquished the office on 23 May that year, and became Lord Treasurer of Ireland in 1340. He was reappointed Chief Baron in 1344.

In 1347, he was accused of misconduct, and a commission of oyer and terminer, headed by Thomas de Dent, the Chief Justice of the Irish Common Pleas, was set up to inquire into his "oppression". Precisely what form the alleged oppression (a term which has no precise modern equivalent) took is unclear. Similar charges against his successor, John de Burnham, were concerned with fraud and financial mismanagement, and it seems that the Privy Council of Ireland had some doubts about de Burgh's honesty. The complaints against him formed part of a wider pattern of general dissatisfaction with the King's Irish royal servants and, as a result, the commission's remit was soon extended into an examination of official wrongdoing more generally.

John de Burnham, an English Crown official with long experience in financial administration, was sent to Ireland as Treasurer to reform de Burgh's alleged abuses, only to spend much of his career fighting charges of corruption. In 1348, de Burgh went to England to plead his case; presumably, he made a convincing defence of his actions, since he received a royal pardon for any transgressions he had committed. He returned to Ireland, and remained Chief Baron until 1351; he died a year later.

References

14th-century Irish judges
Hugh
Normans in Ireland
1351 deaths
Year of birth unknown
Chief Barons of the Irish Exchequer
Lord High Treasurers of Ireland